Gangvaa is a 1984 Indian Hindi-language film directed by Rajasekhar, starring Rajinikanth and Shabana Azmi. It is a remake of Rajasekhar's 1983 Tamil film Malaiyoor Mambattiyan.

Plot 
The basic injustice at the core of Gangvaa is the way the landed classes take advantage of ordinary village folk. Early on in the film, a work crew finds a pot full of gold coins and Thakur Mahendra Singh (Amrish Puri) confiscates them to add to his already massive wealth. Enter Gangvaa (Rajnikanth) to save the day; Gangvaa kills Zamindar and his goons. Gangvaa puts together a band of the men who had suffered under the Zamindar's tyranny. Together they hang out in the wilderness and perform Robin-Hood-esque raids for the sake of vigilante justice.  At some point Jamna (Shabana Azmi) encounters Gangvaa and is smitten.  Then a village girl accuses Gangvaa of rape, and Jamna is enraged – it is here that she gets down to find the truth. It turns out that the rape was actually done by a totally different guy named Gangvaa (Raza Murad), and righting this wrong wins Jamna back for our hero, but makes him a new set of enemies that he spends the rest of the film fleeing from.  Also on his tail is a police inspector (Suresh Oberoi), who cannot allow vigilante justice in his district, no matter how noble the intention.

Cast 
Rajinikanth as Gangadin "Gangvaa"
Shabana Azmi as Jamna
Sarika as Champa
Suresh Oberoi as DSP
Raza Murad as Fake Gangvaa
Kader Khan as Chhote Thakur
Amrish Puri as Thakur Mahendra Singh
Mazhar Khan as Abdullah
Viju Khote as Bheema
Shubha Khote as Jamna's Foster Mother
Arun Bakshi as Jamna's Fiancée
Chandrashekhar as Jaishankar
Dulari

Music

References

External links 
 

1980s Hindi-language films
1984 films
Films directed by Rajasekhar (director)
Films scored by Bappi Lahiri
Hindi remakes of Tamil films